There were 128 qualifying places available for archery at the 2012 Summer Olympics: 64 for men and 64 for women.

Each National Olympic Committee (NOC) can enter a maximum of 6 competitors, 3 per each gender. NOCs that qualify teams for a particular gender are able to send a three-member team to the team event and also have each member compete in the individual event. There were 12 team spots for each gender, thus qualifying 36 individuals through team qualification.  All other NOCs may earn a maximum of 1 quota place per gender for the individual events.

6 places are reserved for Great Britain as host nation, and a further 6 shall be decided upon by the Tripartite Commission. The remaining 116 places shall therefore be allocated through a qualification process, in which archers earn quota places for their respective NOCs, though not necessarily for themselves.

To be eligible to participate in the Olympic Games after the NOC has obtained a quota place, all archers must have achieved the following Minimum Qualification Score (MQS):

 Men: FITA round of 1230 or 70m round of 625
 Women: FITA round of 1230 or 70m round of 600

The MQS must be achieved between 2 July 2011 (starting at the 2011 World Outdoor Archery Championships) and 1 July 2012 at a registered FITA event.

Qualification timeline

Men 

 Eight spots were initially available through the World Championships individual events.  Three of those spots were taken by Japan, India and Chinese Taipei.  Those NOCs later won team places at the Final Qualification team event.  This team qualification replaced the individual qualifications from the World Championships and released three further individual quota places to be awarded at the Final Qualification individual event.
 Israel rejected its quota place won at the European Qualification Tournament. Fourth-placed Camilo Mayr from Germany qualifies instead.

Women 

 Eight spots were initially available through the World Championships individual events, and three in the Pan American Championships.  Three of those spots were taken by Japan, Mexico, and the United States.  Those NOCs later won team places at the Final Qualification team event.  This team qualification replaced the individual qualifications from the World Championships and released three further individual quota places to be awarded at the Final Qualification individual event.  One of the three Tripartite Commission places was also added to the Final Qualification individual event.

See also 
 Archery at the Summer Olympics#Qualification

References 

Qualification
Qualification for the 2012 Summer Olympics